Stade Olympique Cassis Carnoux was a French association football team founded in 2002. They were based in Cassis, Bouches-du-Rhône, and last played in the Championnat National – the third tier of French football. They played at the Stade Marcel Cerdan in Carnoux.

The club was dissolved in December 2010.

Honours
 Championnat de France Amateurs Group C Winners: 2008

References

External links
 SO Cassis Carnoux Official Forum 

Cassis Carnoux
2002 establishments in France
2010 disestablishments in France
Sport in Bouches-du-Rhône
Football clubs in Provence-Alpes-Côte d'Azur